The American College of Pediatricians (ACPeds) is a socially conservative advocacy group of pediatricians and other healthcare professionals in the United States. The group was founded in 2002. In 2005, it reportedly had between 150 and 200 members and one employee; in 2016, it reportedly had 500 physician members. The group's primary focus is advocating against abortion and the adoption of children by gay or lesbian people. It also advocates conversion therapy.

The organization's view on parenting differs from the position of the American Academy of Pediatrics, which holds that sexuality has no connection with the ability to be a good parent and to raise healthy and well-adjusted children. ACPeds has been listed as a hate group by the Southern Poverty Law Center for pushing "anti-LGBTQ junk science". A number of mainstream researchers, including the director of the US National Institutes of Health, have accused ACPeds of misusing or mischaracterizing their work to advance ACPeds' political agenda.

Founding and membership 

The group was founded in 2002 by a group of pediatricians, including Joseph Zanga, a past president of the American Academy of Pediatrics (AAP), as a protest against the AAP's support for adoption by gay couples. ACPeds reports its membership at "over 500 physicians and other healthcare professionals".

The ACPeds is currently led by its president, Quentin Van Meter.

Positions 
ACPeds has vehemently condemned the American Psychological Association as a "gay-affirming program" that "devalues self-restraint" and supports "a child's autonomy from the authority of both family and religion, and from the limits and norms these institutions place on children". ACPeds also has adopted positions strongly opposed to parental affirmation and medical interventions in support of non-traditional or transgender gender identities in children.

Publications 
In response to the publication by the medical and professional organization American Academy of Pediatrics of Just the Facts, a handbook on teen sexual orientation aimed at a school audience, ACPeds issued its own publication, Facts About Youth, in March 2010, accompanied by a web site. Facts About Youth, along with a cover letter, was mailed to 14,800 school superintendents on behalf of Tom Benton, president of ACPeds. Facts About Youth was challenged as not acknowledging the scientific and medical evidence regarding sexual orientation, sexual identity, sexual health, or effective health education by the American Academy of Pediatrics.

The ACPeds letter to the superintendents primarily addressed same-sex attraction, and recommended that "well-intentioned but misinformed school personnel" who encourage students to "come out as gay" and affirm them as such may lead the students into "harmful homosexual behaviors that they otherwise would not pursue." The ACPeds letter to the superintendents also stated that gender dysphoria will typically disappear by puberty "if the behavior is not reinforced" and similarly alleged that "most students (over 85 percent) with same-sex attractions will ultimately adopt a heterosexual orientation if not otherwise encouraged."

Reception 

Some scientists have voiced concerns that ACPeds mischaracterized or misused their work to advance its political agenda. Gary Remafedi, a pediatrician at the University of Minnesota, wrote ACPeds a public letter accusing them of fundamentally mischaracterizing his research in their publications to argue that schools should deny support to gay teenagers. Francis Collins, a geneticist and director of the U.S. National Institutes of Health (NIH), issued a statement through the NIH accusing the ACPeds of misleading children and parents on its Facts About Youth website. Warren Throckmorton, a therapist who specializes in sexual orientation issues, similarly stated that his research had been misused, saying of ACPeds: "They say they're impartial and not motivated by political or religious concerns, but if you look at who they're affiliated with and how they're using the research, that's just obviously not true."

In an amicus brief regarding the removal of a child from the foster home of a same-sex couple (Kutil and Hess v West Virginia) the National Association of Social Workers (NASW) described ACPeds as a "small and marginal group" which was "out of step with the research-based position of the AAP and other medical and child welfare authorities". The LGBT advocacy organization PFLAG categorizes the ACPeds as an anti-equality organization, describing the group as a "small splinter group of medical professionals who do not support the mainstream view of the American Academy of Pediatricians (AAP) that homosexuality is a normal aspect of human diversity".

The American College of Pediatricians has been described by the Southern Poverty Law Center as a "hate group", and a "fringe group" which closely collaborates with the National Association for Research & Therapy of Homosexuality (NARTH) with "a history of propagating damaging falsehoods about LGBT people, including linking homosexuality to pedophilia". In response to an ACPeds brief, the American Civil Liberties Union (ACLU) wrote that ACPeds is a fringe group that has acted to promote "unscientific and harmful 'reparative therapies' for LGBTQ students".

Surgical oncologist David Gorski has said that statements from ACPeds have been used by quack sites like Natural News to push an anti-vaccine agenda. Gorski has said that organizations spreading misinformation regarding HPV vaccine have often cited ACPed.

See also
 American Pediatric Society
 Academic Pediatric Association

References

External links
 

Anti-abortion organizations in the United States
Conservative organizations in the United States
Organizations that oppose LGBT rights in the United States